Short for Something is the third album by the New Klezmer Trio, Ben Goldberg - clarinet, Dan Seamans - bass, and Kenny Wollesen - drums, which was released on the Tzadik label in 2000.

Reception

In his review for Allmusic, Stacia Proefrock observed "Their music is fully embedded in modern creative avant-garde jazz, yet still manages to nod its head to the sounds of old Cracow, creating a cauldron of spiritual yearnings, sadness, chaos, visions, and grace".

Track listing
All compositions by Ben Goldberg except as indicated
 "The Because Of" - 7:09  
 "Short for Something" - 3:56  
 "Fast" - 10:47  
 "Sequential" - 0:50  
 "Obsessive" - 2:35  
 "All Chords Stand for Other Chords" - 5:41  
 "Fomus Homus" - 5:42  
 "Seven Phrases" - 4:27  
 "Complicated" - 3:42  
 "LBD" - 2:42  
 "Halves" - 6:02  
 "Fly in the Ointment" - 3:08  
 "Freylekhs fun der Khupe" (Traditional) - 4:31

Personnel
Ben Goldberg - clarinet
Dan Seamans - bass
Kenny Wollesen - drums

References 

Tzadik Records albums
Ben Goldberg albums
2000 albums